The 2013 Richmond Spiders baseball team will represent University of Richmond in the 2013 NCAA Division I baseball season.  They are coming off a 2012 season, in which they made it to the Atlantic 10 Championship game.  Head Coach Mark McQueen is in his 5th year coaching the Spiders.

Personnel

2013 Roster

Schedule 

! style="background:#000099;color:#FF0000;"| Regular Season
|- valign="top" 

|- bgcolor="#ccffcc"
| February 15 ||  || – || Pitt Field || 10–4 || J. de Marte (1-0)||Weigel (0-1)||None|| 352 || 1–0 || –
|- bgcolor="#ccffcc"
| February 16 || Bucknell || – || Pitt Field || 6-3 ||Z. Sterling (1-0)||Hough (0-1)||R. Cook (1)|| 103 || 2-0 || –
|- bgcolor="#ccffcc"
| February 17 || Bucknell|| – || Pitt Field || 6-1 || A. Blum (1-0)||Goldstien (0-1)|| None || 101 || 3-0 || –
|- bgcolor="#ccffcc"
| February 20 ||  || – || Pitt Field || 5-4 || R. Donnelly (1-0)||Lighton (0-1)||D. Stoops (1)|| 176 || 4-0 || –
|- bgcolor="#ccffcc"
| February 22 || at  || – || John Sessions Stadium|| 8–3 ||J. de Marte (2-0)||Anderson,C (0-1)||R. Cook (2)|| 162 || 5-0 || –
|- align="center" bgcolor="#ffbbb"
| February 23 ||  at Jacksonville || – || John Sessions Stadium || 4–5 ||Mcrae (1-0)||Z. Sterling (1-1)|| Woods(1)|| 155 || 5–1 || –
|- align="center" bgcolor="#ffbbb"
| February 24 ||  at Jacksonville || – || John Sessions Stadium || 8–9 ||Maxon (1-0)|| D. Stoops (0-1)||None|| 176 || 5–2 || –
|- bgcolor="#ccffcc"
| February 27 ||  || – || Pitt Field || 13-0 || C. Bates (1-0)||Hawk (0-1)||None|| 131|| 6–2 || –
|-

|- bgcolor="#ccffcc"
| March 1 ||  || – || Pitt Field  || 8–6 ||J. de Marte (3-0)||C. Smith (0-1)||D. Stoops(2)|| 108 || 7–2 || –
|- bgcolor="#ccffcc"
| March 2 || Wagner|| – || Pitt Field|| 4–2 || Z. Sterling (2-1)||Casey (0-2)||J. Lively(1)|| 104 || 8–2 || –
|- bgcolor="#ccffcc"
| March 3 || Wagner|| – || Pitt Field|| 10-5 ||A. Blum (2-0)||Schmardel (0-1)||D. Stoops (3)|| 247 || 9–2 || –
|- bgcolor="#ccffcc"
| March 5 || Old Dominion || – || Pitt Field ||7-6||P. Bayer (1-0)||Alexander (0-2) ||R. Cook (3)||132||10–2|| –
|- bgcolor="#CCCCCC"
| March 6 ||  || – || Pitt Field ||colspan=7|Cancelled due to weather
|- bgcolor="#ccffcc"
| March 9 ||  || – || Pitt Field || 2-1 || J. Lively (1-0) || D. Lamacchia (1-1)|| None || 355 || 11-2 || –
|- bgcolor="#ccffcc"
| March 10 || Quinnipiac || – || Pitt Field || 5-4 || D. Stoops (1-1) || M. Siciliano (0-1) || None || 212 || 12-2 || –
|- align="center" bgcolor="#ffbbb"
| March 10 || Quinnipiac || – || Pitt Field || 2-5 || N. Fabrizio (2-0)|| R. Cook (0-1) ||Binkiewicz (2)|| 313 || 12-3 || –
|- bgcolor="#ccffcc"
| March 12 ||  || – || Pitt Field || 11-2 ||P. Bayer(2-0)|| N. Kendrick (1-1) || None || 211 || 13-3 || –
|- bgcolor="#ccffcc"
| March 13 || at George Mason || – ||Spuhler Field || 7-5 ||R. Harron (1-0)|| C. Payne (0-1) ||D. Martinson(1) || 127 || 14-3 || –
|- align="center" bgcolor="#ffbbb"
| March 15 ||  || – || Pitt Field  || 4-5 || C. Lasky (1-0) || R. Cook (0-2) || Corsi(1) || 332 || 14-4 || –
|- align="center" bgcolor="#ffbbb"
| March 16 || Rutgers || – || Pitt Field || 8-9 || R. Corsi (1-3) || D. Stoops (1-2) || None || 303 || 14-5 || –
|- bgcolor="#CCCCCC"
| March 18 || Rutgers || – || Pitt Field || colspan=7|Cancelled due to weather
|- align="center" bgcolor="#ffbbb"
| March 20 || at VMI || – || Gray–Minor Stadium || 5-9 || T. Lighton (2-2) || P. Bayer (2-1) || None || 133 || 14-6 || –
|- align="center" bgcolor="#ffbbb"
| March 22 || * || – || Pitt Field || 5-8 || H. May (6-0) || A. Brockett (0-1) || None || 210 || 14-7 || 0–1
|- bgcolor="#ccffcc"
| March 23 || Charlotte* || – || Pitt Field || 4-3 || A. Blum (3-0) || R. Mas (1-1) || J. Lively(2) || 366 || 15-7 || 1-1
|- align="center" bgcolor="#ffbbb"
| March 24 || Charlotte* || – ||Pitt Field || 4-6 || R. Mas (2-1) || L. Harron (1-1) || M. Wells(1) || 121 || 15–8 || 1–2 
|- bgcolor="#CCCCCC"
| March 26 || at Coppin State|| – || Joe Cannon Stadium || colspan=7|Cancelled due to weather
|- bgcolor="#ccffcc"
| March 28 || at * || – || Hank DeVincent Field || 6–2 || Z. Sterling (3-1) || L. Donohue (1-2) || J. Lively(3) || 105 || 16–8 || 2–2
|- align="center" bgcolor="#ffbbb"
| March 29 || at La Salle* || – || Hank DeVincent Field || 3–5 || Christensen (3-1) || A. Brockett (0-2)|| None || 109 || 16-9 || 2-3
|- bgcolor="#ccffcc"
| March 30 || at La Salle* || – || Hank DeVincent Field || 22–1 || P. Bayer (3-1) || L. O'Neill (2-3) || None || 127 || 17-9 || 3-3
|-

|- bgcolor="#ccffcc"
|April 2 ||  || - || Pitt Field || 5–4 || J. Mayers (1-0) || M. Aker (1-1) || None || 222 || 18-9 || 3-3
|- bgcolor="#ccffcc"
|April 5 || at * || - || Barcroft Park || 10-2 || Z. Sterling (4-1) || L. Staub (3-2) || None || 150 || 19-9 || 4-3
|- bgcolor="#ccffcc"
|April 6 || at George Washington* || - || Barcroft Park || 3-1 ||A. Blum (4-0) || C. Milon (2-2) || J. Mayers(2) || 238 || 20-9 || 5-3
|- bgcolor="#ccffcc"
|April 7 || at George Washington* || - || Barcroft Park || 8-7 || A. Brockett (1-2) || C. Lejeune (0-1) || R. Harron(1) || 207 || 21-9 || 6-3
|- align="center" bgcolor="#ffbbb"
|April 9 || at Old Dominion || - || Bud Metheny Baseball Complex || 4-7 || V. Diaz (1-0) || C. Bates (1-1) || B. Smith(6) || 384 || 21-10 || 6-3
|- bgcolor="#ccffcc"
| April 12 ||  || - || Pitt Field || 11-10 || J. Lively (2-0) || N. Cubarney (3-3) || None || 165 || 22-10 || 6-3
|- align="center" bgcolor="#ffbbb"
| April 13 || Northeastern || - || Pitt Field || 5-12 || B. McLean (1-0) || R. Cook (0-3) || None || 503 || 22-11 || 6-3
|- bgcolor="#ccffcc"
| April 14 || Northeastern || - || Pitt Field || 5-4 || A. Brockett (2-2) || D. Maki (1-2) || None || 211 || 23-11 || 6-3
|- align="center" bgcolor="#ffbbb"
| April 17 || at William & Mary || - || Plumeri Park || 6-7 || Sheenan (4-2) || Lively (2-1) || Wainman(5) || 235 || 23-12 || 6-3
|- align="center" bgcolor="#ffbbb"
| April 19 || * || - || Pitt Field || 7-9 || Muha (2-0) || Martinson (0-1) || None || 121 || 23-13 || 6-4
|- align="center" bgcolor="#ffbbb"
| April 20 || St. Joseph's* || - || Pitt Field || 3-7 || Carter (3-2) || Bates (1-2) || Yacabonis(5) || 322 || 23-14 || 6-5
|- bgcolor="#ccffcc"
| April 21 || St. Joseph's* || - || Pitt Field || 2-1 || J. Mayers (2-0) || D. Thorpe (3-6) || None || 305 || 24-14 || 7-5
|- align="center" bgcolor="#ffbbb"
| April 23 || at  || - || Davenport Field || 2-6 ||  Rosenberger (1-0) || C. Bates (1-3) || None || 2,799 || 24-15 || 7-5
|- bgcolor="#ccffcc"
| April 26 || at * || - || Pitt Field || 8-7 || P. Bayer (4-1) || A. Alemann (6-3) || None || 240 || 25-15 || 8-5
|- bgcolor="#ccffcc"
| April 27 || St. Louis* || - || Pitt Field || 3-1 || A. Blum (5-0) || N. Bates (6-3) || A. Brockett(3) || 310 || 26-15 || 9-5
|- align="center" bgcolor="#ffbbb"
| April 28 || St. Louis* || - || Pitt Field || 0-2 || C. Smith (6-2) || J. Mayers (2-1) || None || 311 || 26-16 || 9-6
|-

|- bgcolor="#ccffcc"
| May 3 || * || - || Pitt Field || 6-1 || de Marte (4-0) || P. Peterson (2-6) || Grossfeld(1) || 377 || 27-16 || 10-6
|- align="center" bgcolor="#ffbbb"
| May 4 ||  Temple* || - || Pitt Field || 1-2 || E. Peterson (6-2) || A. Blum (5-1) || Kuehn(5) || 265 || 27-17 || 10-7
|- bgcolor="#ccffcc"
| May 5 ||  Temple* || - || Pitt Field || 4-3 || A Brockett (3-2) || McCarthy (2-2) || None || 244 || 28-17 || 11-7
|- align="center" bgcolor="#ffbbb"
| May 7 || at Longwood || - || Farmville, VA || 2-3 || S. Burkett (1-0) || Harron (1-2) || None || 207 || 28-18 || 11-7
|- bgcolor="#ccffcc"
| May 10 || at * || - || Houlihan Park || 9-8 || Bates (2-3) || Charest (2-9) || None || 561 || 29-18 || 12-7
|- align="center" bgcolor="#ffbbb"
| May 11 || at Fordham* || - || Houlihan Park || 1-2 || R. Anastasi (4-4) || P. Bayers (4-3) || None || 211 || 29-19 || 12-8
|- bgcolor="#ccffcc"
| May 12 || at Fordham* || - || Houlihan Park || 6-2 || J. Mayers (4-1) || J. Murphy (0-5) || None || 250 || 30-19 || 13-8
|- align="center" bgcolor="#ffbbb"
| May 16 || at VCU* || - || The Diamond || 3-6 || H. Dwyer (7-6) || de Marte (4-1) || M. Lees(10) || 709 || 30-20 || 13-9
|- align="center" bgcolor="#ffbbb"
| May 17 || at VCU* || - || The Diamond || 4-5 || L. Kanuik (4-2) || Grossfeld (0-1) || M. Lees(11) || 250 || 30-21 || 13-10
|- align="center" bgcolor="#ffbbb"
| May 18 || at VCU* || - || The Diamond || 0-5 || S. Greene (5-1) || Mayers (4-2) || None || 364 || 30-22 || 13-11
|-

|- align="center" bgcolor="#ffbbb"
| May 22 || Charlotte || - || Hayes Stadium || 5-6 || w. Hatley (2-2) || Grossfield (0-2) || R. Mas(4) || - || 0-1 
|- bgcolor="#ccffcc"
| May 22 || La Salle || - || Hayes Stadium || 7-2 || J. De Marte (5-1)''' || R. Donohue (3-5) || None || - || 1-1 
|- align="center" bgcolor="#ffbbb"
| May 23 || St. Louis || - || Hayes Stadium || 6-10 || Levin (3-0) || Blum (5-2) || None || - || 1-2
|-

|-
| style="font-size:88%" | Rankings from USA TODAY/ESPN Top 25 coaches' baseball poll. Parenthesis indicate tournament seedings.
|-
| style="font-size:88%" | *Atlantic 10 Conference games

Awards and honors

See also 
 Richmond Spiders
 2013 NCAA Division I baseball season

References 

Richmond
Richmond Spiders baseball seasons
Richmond